Hillsong: Let Hope Rise is a 2016 American Christian documentary film on Hillsong United directed by Michael John Warren. The film was released on 16 September 2016, by Pure Flix Entertainment after several delays.

Synopsis
The film chronicles the unlikely rise to prominence of the Australia-based Christian band Hillsong United. Their music is so popular it is estimated that on any given Sunday, more than 50 million churchgoers around the world are singing their songs. The film follows an event that took place on 23 October 2014 at the Forum arena in Los Angeles with 17,000 people attending, and moments preceding the concert with the creation of new songs featured on Empires (2015).

Soundtrack
Hillsong: Let Hope Rise - Original Motion Picture Soundtrack was released as the film's soundtrack on 12 August 2016 under Hillsong Music, Sparrow Records and Capitol Christian Music Group. The soundtrack features songs from Hillsong United, as well as Hillsong's Worship and Young & Free divisions.

Track listing

Charts

Release
Directed by Michael John Warren, the film was originally supposed be released by Warner Bros. during the 2015 Easter weekend. In March 2015, Relativity Media obtained the distribution rights and the film shifted to a 29 May release. In April, Relativity moved the film to 30 September 2015. However, after Relativity Media filed for Chapter 11 bankruptcy, the film was moved to an unknown release date. The film was later picked up by Pure Flix Entertainment and the film was released on 16 September 2016.

Reception

Box office
The film made $1.4 million from 816 theaters in its opening weekend, which was considered low, with Deadline Hollywood saying "we've seen [documentaries] make this much money on half the number of screens".

Critical response
On Rotten Tomatoes, the film holds an approval rating of 60%, based on 10 reviews, with an average rating of 6.04/10. On Metacritic, the film received a weighted average score of 43 out of 100, based on six critics, indicating "mixed or average reviews". Audiences polled by CinemaScore gave the film an average grade of "A" on an A+ to F scale, while those at PostTrak gave it an overall positive score of 90%.

Nick Olszyk of Catholic World Report gave it his highest rating of five reels, saying it "renewed [my] courage to face my trails." He also said their performance of Oceans was "as good as anything by Bach, Handel, or the great anonymous monastics of the Middle Ages."

References

External links
 
 
 
 

2016 films
American documentary films
2016 documentary films
Documentary films about singers
Biographical films about musicians
Films about Christianity
Films about religion
Christian media
Pure Flix Entertainment films
2010s English-language films
2010s American films